The Gazi Omer Bey Mosque (from ) is a historical Ottoman-era mosque in the town of Livadeia, Central Greece, in Greece. It was built in the commercial center and the most densely populated district of the town. Although it was left abandoned for long, there are plans to renovate it and use it anew for cultural purposes.

History 
Livadeia was conquered by Omer Bey in 1460, during the reign of Sultan Mehmed II, and the mosque was named after him when it was erected during the second halve of the fifteenth century. It is the only surviving one of the three Ottoman mosques in Livadeia, and only in part. It was built in the most populous district and commercial center of the town, named Omer Bey, where the Muslim community of the town dwelled.

Following the Greek War of Independence (1821–1829), the mosque became property of the newly founded Greek state. It was left neglected to decay for centuries until in 2015 when the municipality of Livadeia decided the buy the building, with the purchase finalised in 2016, for a total of 200,000 euros, with the aim to restore it and use it for cultural and touristic purposes. It has been declared a preserved monument.

Architecture 
Today, this mosque is preserved only in part. In particular what remains is the main praying room, a square hall covered with a dome, while newer elements have been added on the outside that variate the volume and form of the original building. Only its dome is clearly visible through all the other structures obstructing its view.

See also 
 Islam in Greece
 List of former mosques in Greece
 List of mosques in Greece
 Ottoman Greece

References 

Ottoman mosques in Greece
Former mosques in Greece
Mosque buildings with domes
15th-century mosques
15th-century architecture in Greece
Buildings and structures in Boeotia
Livadeia